The 172nd New York State Legislature, consisting of the New York State Senate and the New York State Assembly, met from January 7, 1959, to April 1, 1960, during the first and second years of Nelson Rockefeller's governorship, in Albany.

Background
Under the provisions of the New York Constitution of 1938, re-apportioned in 1953, 58 Senators and 150 assemblymen were elected in single-seat districts for two-year terms. The senatorial districts consisted either of one or more entire counties; or a contiguous area within a single county. The counties which were divided into more than one senatorial district were Kings (nine districts), New York (six),  Queens (five), Bronx (four), Erie (three), Nassau (three), Westchester (three), Monroe (two) and Onondaga (two). The Assembly districts consisted either of a single entire county (except Hamilton Co.), or of contiguous area within one county.

At this time there were two major political parties: the Republican Party and the Democratic Party. The Liberal Party and the Independent-Socialist Party also nominated tickets.

Elections
The 1958 New York state election, was held on November 4. Nelson Rockefeller was elected Governor, and Assemblyman Malcolm Wilson was elected Lieutenant Governor, both Republicans, defeating the incumbent Democrats W. Averell Harriman and George B. DeLuca. The elections of the other four statewide elective offices resulted in a Democratic State Comptroller with Liberal endorsement, a Republican Attorney General, a Democratic Court of Appeals judge with Liberal and Republican endorsement, and a Republican U.S. Senator. The approximate party strength at this election, as expressed by the vote for Governor/Lieutenant Governor, was: Republicans 3,127,000; Democrats 2,270,000; Liberals 284,000; and Independent-Socialists 32,000.

Assemblywoman Janet Hill Gordon (Rep.), a lawyer of Norwich, was elected to the State Senate. The other four women members of the previous legislature—Assemblywomen Bessie A. Buchanan (Dem.), a retired musical actress and dancer of Harlem; ; Frances K. Marlatt (Rep.), a lawyer of Mount Vernon; Genesta M. Strong (Rep.), of Plandome Heights; and Mildred F. Taylor (Rep.), a coal dealer of Lyons—were re-elected. Aileen B. Ryan (Dem.), of the Bronx; and Dorothy Bell Lawrence (Rep.), of Manhattan, both former school teachers, were also elected to the Assembly.

The 1959 New York state election, was held on November 3. The only statewide elective office up for election was Chief Judge of the New York Court of Appeals. The senior associate judge, Charles S. Desmond, a Democrat, was elected with Republican and Liberal endorsement. Three vacancies in the State Senate and eight vacancies in the Assembly were filled. Assemblywoman Genesta M. Strong (Rep.) was elected to the State Senate, but did not take her seat in 1960.

Sessions
The Legislature met for the first regular session (the 182nd) at the State Capitol in Albany on January 7, 1959; and adjourned on March 25.

Oswald D. Heck (Rep.) was re-elected Speaker. Heck died on May 21, 1959.

Walter J. Mahoney (Rep.) was re-elected Temporary President of the State Senate.

The Legislature met for a special session at the State Capitol in Albany on July 1, 1959. Majority Leader Joseph F. Carlino (Rep.) was elected Speaker of the Assembly.

The Legislature met for the second regular session (the 183rd) at the State Capitol in Albany on January 6, 1960; and adjourned in the early morning of April 1, 1960.

State Senate

Districts

Senators
The asterisk (*) denotes members of the previous Legislature who continued in office as members of this Legislature. Frank Composto, D. Clinton Dominick III, Lawrence M. Rulison and Janet Hill Gordon changed from the Assembly to the Senate at the beginning of this Legislature. Assembly members Genesta M. Strong and Hunter Meighan were elected to fill vacancies in the Senate.

Note: For brevity, the chairmanships omit the words "...the Committee on (the)..."

Employees
 Secretary: William S. King, until June 18, 1959, retired
 John J. Sandler, acting from June 18, 1959; elected Secretary on January 6, 1960

State Assembly

Assemblymen

Note: For brevity, the chairmanships omit the words "...the Committee on (the)..."

Employees
 Clerk: Ansley B. Borkowski
 Sergeant-at-Arms: Raymond J. Roche
 Deputy Journal Clerk: Maude E. Ten Eyck

Notes

Sources
 FULL LIST OF LEGISLATORS in the Civil Service Leader (Vol. XXI, No. 23, February 16, 1960; pg. 14)
 Members of the New York Senate (1950s) at Political Graveyard
 Members of the New York Assembly (1950s) at Political Graveyard
 Members of the New York Senate (1960s) at Political Graveyard
 Members of the New York Assembly (1960s) at Political Graveyard

172
1959 in New York (state)
1960 in New York (state)
1959 U.S. legislative sessions
1960 U.S. legislative sessions